The Mozambique Drill, also known as the Failure Drill, or Failure to Stop drill and, informally, as "two to the body, one to the head," is a close-quarters shooting technique that requires the shooter to fire twice into the torso of a target (known as a double tap or hammered pair to the center of mass), and follow up with a more difficult head shot that, if properly placed, will instantaneously stop the target if the previous shots failed to do so.

History
According to anecdotal history, the technique originated with a Rhodesian mercenary, Mike Rousseau, engaged in the Mozambican War of Independence (1964–1974). Fighting at the airport at Lourenço Marques (modern-day Maputo), Rousseau rounded a corner and encountered an enemy combatant, armed with an AK-47 assault rifle, at 10 paces. Rousseau immediately brought up his Browning HP35 pistol and fired two bullets into the target's upper chest, usually enough to incapacitate or kill outright. Seeing that the fighter was still advancing, Rousseau attempted a head shot that hit the guerrilla through the base of his neck, severing the spinal cord. Rousseau related the story to an acquaintance, small arms expert Jeff Cooper, founder of the Gunsite Academy shooting school, who incorporated the "Mozambique Drill" into his modern technique shooting method.

The Mozambique Drill was incorporated in the Gunsite curriculum from the late 1970s. In 1980, two Los Angeles Police Department SWAT officers, Larry Mudgett and John Helms, attended pistol training at Gunsite and received permission from Cooper to teach the technique to the LAPD, and to rename it the Failure Drill (concerned that "Mozambique" might have racist overtones).

Theory and technique
The Mozambique Drill is intended to ensure that the target is immediately stopped, by first placing two shots into the larger, easier-to-hit mass of the upper body, then, if the target is still active, following with a third, more precisely aimed and difficult head shot. Due to factors such as body armor, the bolstering effect of drugs, or failure to hit vital organs, the body shots may not be immediately effective, necessitating the third shot. To guarantee instant incapacitation by impacting the brain and central nervous system, the head shot must be delivered to the area between eyebrows and upper lip, otherwise, various bony areas of the skull could deflect the bullet.

In popular culture
The Mozambique Drill is featured in a number of movies, notably Heat and Collateral, both directed by Michael Mann.

See also
Practical shooting
Stopping power

References

Techniques
Law enforcement techniques